Maysky is a rural locality (a settlement) in Ivanovskoye Rural Settlement, Paninsky District, Voronezh Oblast, Russia. The population was 88 as of 2010. There are 2 streets.

Geography 
Maysky is located on the Pravaya Khava River, 11 km southwest of Panino (the district's administrative centre) by road. Katukhovskie Vyselki 2-ye is the nearest rural locality.

References 

Rural localities in Paninsky District